Alto Pelado is a village and municipality in San Luis Province in central Argentina. It's known in the region for hosting the Pampas Deer Festival.

References

Municipios de San Luis 

Populated places in San Luis Province